The FIS Nordic World Ski Championships 1954 took place 13–21 February 1954 in Falun, Sweden. These were the first races where women competed with events in the 10 km and 3 × 5 km relay. It also saw the 18 km reduced to 15 km in men's cross-country along with the return of the 30 km which was last held in 1926. The Nordic combined saw the ski jump held first with the cross-country distance reduced to 15 km as well. The Soviet Union also debuted in these championships as well.

Men's cross-country

15 km 
17 February 1954

30 km 
14 February 1954

Vladimir Kuzin was the first person from the Soviet Union to win an event at the FIS Nordic World Ski Championships.

50 km 
21 February 1954

4 × 10 km relay
20 February 1954

Women's cross-country

10 km 
21 February 1954

Kozyreva was the first woman to win at the FIS Nordic World Ski Championships.

3 × 5 km relay
17 February 1954

Men's Nordic combined

Individual 
16 February 1954 (Jumping)
17 February 1954 (Skiing, included in 15 km run)

Men's ski jumping

Individual large hill 
14 February 1954

Medal table

References
FIS 1954 Cross-country results
FIS 1954 Nordic combined results
FIS 1954 Ski jumping results
Results from German Wikipedia

External links

The event at SVT's open archive 

FIS Nordic World Ski Championships
Nordic Skiing
1954 in Nordic combined
1954 in Swedish sport
February 1954 sports events in Europe
Nordic skiing competitions in Sweden
Sports competitions in Falun